Beana opala is a moth of the family Nolidae first described by Pagenstecher in 1900. It is found on the Bismarck Archipelago and Papua New Guinea.

References

Nolidae
Moths of Papua New Guinea